Meszaros (Anglicised as
Mesaros), Mészáros, and Mesaroš are Hungarian occupational surnames, meaning "slaughterer".

 Andrej Meszároš (born 1985), Slovak hockey player
 Erika Mészáros (born 1966), Hungarian sprint canoer
 Ferenc Mészáros (disambiguation)
 István Mészáros (disambiguation)
 Johann Mészáros von Szoboszló (1737–1801), Austro-Hungarian general
 Karol Mészáros (born 1993), Slovak footballer
 Lázár Mészáros (1796–1858), Hungarian Minister of War
 Márta Mészáros (born 1931), Hungarian screenwriter/film director
 Mike Mesaros (musician), bass and vocalist of The Smithereens
 Michu Meszaros (1939–2016), Hungarian performer
 Mihalj Mesaroš (1935–2017), Yugoslav/Serbian footballer
 Peter Mészáros (born 1943), Hungarian-American physicist

Mesaroş 
 Alexandru Mesian ( Mesaroş; born 1937), Bishop of Lugoj
  (born 15 October 1953, Moscow), Romanian former politician (deputy in the 1990-1992 legislature)

See also
 Mészáros effect

Hungarian words and phrases
Slavic-language surnames
Hungarian-language surnames
Occupational surnames